Robert H. Kennedy (born December 26, 1993) is an American professional sports car racing driver in the Trans-Am Series for his family-owned Bobby Kennedy Racing. He has also raced in the NASCAR Gander RV & Outdoors Truck Series.

Racing career
Kennedy and his Bobby Kennedy Racing team compete in the Trans-Am Series' TA2 class.

In August 2020, Kennedy made his NASCAR Gander RV & Outdoors Truck Series debut on the Daytona International Speedway road course, driving the No. 00 Chevrolet Silverado for Reaume Brothers Racing.

Personal life
Kennedy grew up in Brooksville, Florida, and lives in Ormond Beach, Florida.

Motorsports career results

NASCAR
(key) (Bold – Pole position awarded by qualifying time. Italics – Pole position earned by points standings or practice time. * – Most laps led.)

Gander RV & Outdoors Truck Series

References

External links
 

1993 births
Living people
NASCAR drivers
People from Port Orange, Florida
Racing drivers from Florida